The WCWA Television Championship was a secondary professional wrestling championship that was used and defended in the World Class Wrestling Association (WCWA). Originally created in 1979 as the NWA Television Championship, one of many television championships across the NWA territories, it was primarily defended on their weekly television show. At the time of its creation the championship was promoted by NWA Big Time Wrestling (BTW). BTW changed its name to "World Class Championship Wrestling" (WCCW) in 1982 and the championship became known as the WCCW Television Championship. In 1986 WCCW withdrew from the NWA and became known as the World Class Wrestling Association. As it is a professional wrestling championship, it is won not by actual competition, but by a scripted ending to a match.

The first NWA Television Champion was The Spoiler, who won a battle royal on January 7, 1979, to claim the championship. Bill Irwin won the championship a record-setting seven times between 1979 and 1982. Irwin's second reign lasted 181 days, the longest individual reign of any of the champions and his combined reigns total at least 464 days, possibly 467 days. Kevin Von Erich was awarded the championship due to a disqualification, but refused to win the championship in such manner and immediately vacated it, putting his reign at only a couple of minutes, the shortest of any champion. After the final champion, Tony Atlas, left the company, the Championship was abandoned in April 1987.

Title history

Combined length

See also
World Class Championship Wrestling

Footnotes

References

World Class Championship Wrestling championships
Television wrestling championships